Harbiye may refer to:
 Harbiye, Antakya, a town in Hatay province, Turkey
 Harbiye, Şişli, a quarter or neighbourhood in Istanbul, Turkey